John Wilson Hudson  (June 30, 1912 in Bryan, Texas – November 7, 1970) was an American professional baseball player, manager and scout. As an active player, the infielder appeared in 426 Major League Baseball games for the Brooklyn Dodgers, Chicago Cubs and New York Giants from 1936 to 1941 and in 1945.

In , Hudson was the Dodgers' starting second baseman, penciled into the lineup for 123 games. He reached MLB career highs in hits (130) and most offensive categories.  However, he led National League second basemen in errors, with 27, that year. Altogether, Hudson collected 283 big-league hits during all or parts of seven seasons, with 50 doubles, 11 triples and four home runs.

After his MLB playing career ended, he was player-manager for the Jacksonville Tars in the South Atlantic League, a Giants' farm team, from 1946 to 1948.  He then scouted for the Giants in Texas and the Southwest from 1949 until his death in 1970.

External links

1912 births
1970 deaths
Allentown Brooks players
Baseball players from Texas
Brooklyn Dodgers players
Chicago Cubs players
Greensboro Patriots players
Jacksonville Tars players
Jeanerette Blues players
Jersey City Giants players
Lake Charles Explorers players
Major League Baseball second basemen
Major League Baseball shortstops
Milwaukee Brewers (minor league) players
Minor league baseball managers
Montreal Royals players
New York Giants (NL) players
New York Giants (NL) scouts
People from Bryan, Texas
San Francisco Giants scouts